Nokia C1-02 is a basic phone running on Nokia OS Series 40. It was announced in June 2010 and released in January 2011. It supports two battery types of Nokia, BL-5C and BL-5CB. It has an internal memory of 10MB and RAM of 16MB. The expandable memory of the device is up to 32GB. It is available in 4 colours namely - Black, Dark Plum, Blue and Cool Grey. Its cost in July 2015 was around Rs. 2169 in India. Outside India it was sold at $19.99 approx (cost in August 2016).

Features
Nokia C1-02 has a TFT screen of 1.8 inches and resolution of 128x160 pixels, which supports around 65500 colors. It has bluetooth v2.1 with A2DP enabled. It is a good music phone and supports MP3, WAV, WMA, AAC+ formats. The device is Java (J2ME) enabled with MIDP 2.1 version. It has features of predictive text inputs. Also it has Voice-Memo. It can be connected to Internet via GPRS, WAP, HTML, XHTML, WML, CSS. It can also be connected to pc via PC Suite or Mass Storage.

Software
The device has support to Ovi Mail, Ovi Chat, Ovi Life Tools, Nokia messaging service, FM Radio, Opera mini, CEC Dictionary, Advanced Calculator, good improved and organised Gallery and Organizer. It also can save 1000 contacts and can do photocalls. It has pre-installed themes, but lacks 3G, GPS, wi-fi and a camera.

Inside The Box
A mobile unit
Battery 
Headset
Nokia charger
User manual
Nokia leaflets
USB cable

References

External links
http://www.gsmarena.com/nokia_c1_02-3366.php

Mobile phones introduced in 2011
C1-02
Mobile phones with user-replaceable battery